Bani Walid Airport  is an airport serving the city of Bani Walid in Libya. The airport is at the western edge of the city.

Google Earth Historical Imagery (1/29/2016) shows an additional  asphalt runway extension to the south, with base layer laid down for a possible  total extension.

See also
Transport in Libya
List of airports in Libya

References

External links
 OurAirports - Beni Walid Airport
 FallingRain - Beni Walid
 OpenStreetMap - Beni Walid

Airports in Libya